Casey Roderick (born August 8, 1992) is an American professional stock car racing driver. He currently competes in The Southern Super Series competition across the south east and various short tracks all over the country.

Racing career 
A native of Lawrenceville, Georgia, Roderick began his racing career in Legends car racing, competing in the Atlanta Motor Speedway's Summer Shootout Series, scoring multiple wins despite inferior equipment. He moved up to late model racing in 2008, competing for Bill Elliott; he spent two years with Elliott's development-driver program, which included running a number of ARCA Racing Series events in a car jointly fielded by Elliott and Phoenix Racing, scoring a pole position at Palm Beach International Raceway, and a win in the series at New Jersey Motorsports Park in 2010; Roderick won the event despite starting 34th in the 35 car field; he was described as a "legitimate protege of...Elliott" by team co-owner Russ Sutton, and "the genuine article" by Elliott himself.

Despite the win, Roderick was released from the Elliott driver development program at the end of 2010 in favor of Elliott's son, Chase. He joined Randy Hill Racing in 2011, running four ARCA races before making his debut in the NASCAR Nationwide Series at Watkins Glen International in a car jointly fielded by RHR and Go Green Racing, and the Camping World Truck Series at Michigan International Speedway with RSS Racing.

Roderick started the 2012 season with Randy Hill Racing, driving the No. 08 in the Nationwide Series as a contender for the series' Rookie of the Year award; after two races however, a lack of sponsorship sidelined the team. He returned to competition at Richmond International Raceway in late April, sponsored by the West Virginia Miners baseball team, but was afterwards released by RHR. Joining SR² Motorsports with the Miners sponsorship, Roderick competed in the next three races, but once again faced sponsorship issues forcing the skipping of races after the May event at Charlotte Motor Speedway. He returned to the series and the No. 24 for the summer races at Road America and Daytona International Speedway.

Starting 2013 without a ride, in May Roderick returned to late model racing, competing in the Southern Super Series starting at Five Flags Speedway in May. Since joining Graham Motorsports in 2013, his accomplishments include winning the Rattler 250, World Crown 300, Blizzard Series in 2015 and 2016 and finishing 3rd in the Southern Super Series in 2015. He won 8 races driving for Ronnie Sanders in the red 18 in 2016, and won the pro late model championship at Montgomery Motor Speedway as well.

Roderick returned to the NASCAR Xfinity Series in 2018, driving the No. 23 Chevrolet Camaro for GMS Racing at Iowa. His last start was at Daytona from 2012.

Motorsports career results

NASCAR 
(key) (Bold – Pole position awarded by qualifying time. Italics – Pole position earned by points standings or practice time. * – Most laps led.)

Xfinity Series

Camping World Truck Series 

* Season still in progress
1 not eligible for series points

ARCA Racing Series 
(key) (Bold – Pole position awarded by qualifying time. Italics – Pole position earned by points standings or practice time. * – Most laps led.)

References

External links 
 
 

Living people
1992 births
People from Lawrenceville, Georgia
Sportspeople from the Atlanta metropolitan area
Racing drivers from Atlanta
Racing drivers from Georgia (U.S. state)
NASCAR drivers
ARCA Menards Series drivers
CARS Tour drivers
ARCA Midwest Tour drivers